The Beijing–Harbin Expressway, designated as G1 and commonly abbreviated as Jingha Expressway is an expressway linking the cities of Beijing and Harbin, Heilongjiang.

The Beijing–Harbin Expressway is commonly referred to as the Jingha Expressway. This name is derived from the two one-character Chinese abbreviations of the two cities at which the expressway terminates, Jing for Beijing and Ha for Harbin.

Route
The Beijing–Harbin Expressway runs from Beijing, the national capital, to Harbin, the capital of Heilongjiang Province. It passes through the following major cities:
 Beijing
 Langfang, Hebei
 Tianjin
 Tangshan, Hebei
 Qinhuangdao, Hebei
 Huludao, Liaoning
 Jinzhou, Liaoning
 Shenyang, Liaoning
 Siping, Jilin
 Changchun, Jilin
 Harbin, Heilongjiang

History
The first section of the Beijing–Harbin Expressway, opened in the 1990s was the short-lived Jingqin Expressway, running between the outskirts of Beijing and Qinhuangdao.

In 1990s the expressway was extended northeast from Qinhuangdao to Shenyang and westward to the 4th Ring Road in Beijing to become the Jingshen Expressway. The 658 km expressway from central Beijing to Shenyang was completed in time for the 50th anniversary of the People's Republic of China. It opened to the general motoring public on September 15, 1999, after four years of work on different sections.

The expressway was extended to Harbin during the rapid expansion of the Chinese expressway system in the 2000s. The completed expressway was opened on September 28, 2001. It is now one of the seven radial expressways emanating from Beijing.

Improvements were made to the expressway in 2003 and 2004 by removing several toll stations in 2003 and repairing the previously uneven road surface between the 6th Ring Road and Xijizhen in Beijing in 2004.

On October 8, 2004, 36 vehicles were involved a horrendous series of car crashes on the expressway. The crashes occurred in the westbound lanes near the interchange with the Jinji Expressway, in the Tianjin municipality. Traffic was delayed up for over one and a half hours.

Toll network
When the expressway opened in September 1999, there was a large amount of complaints about the number of toll booths. In some cases, a toll booth appeared every 15 kilometres.

The Jingshen expressway was constructed by several different organisations, and as a result, each organization set up their own toll gate. This made the route slow to travel on, as traffic piled up in front of toll gates.

The PRC's Ministry of Communications (Transport) stepped in after four years and declared that, effective September 1, 2003, the Baodi toll gate in Tianjin and the Yutian toll gate in Hebei would be demolished, in order to create a networked toll system. Additionally, two expressway toll gates near Shanhaiguan would be merged as one. (Plans also hint that the toll gate at Bailu, Beijing, just east of the Eastern 5th Ring Road, would be gone soon, as soon as Beijing "gets its act together" and joins the networked toll system. The toll gate at Xianghe in Hebei, however, would be kept.)

Thus, for the section from Xianghe in western Hebei through to Shanhaiguan in eastern Hebei (and even through the Tianjin portion), this networked toll system applies—one of the first of its kind. This does away with the previous system, where toll booths appeared every time the jurisdiction changed. For some odd reason, Beijing and Liaoning are still not part of the networked toll system.

China plans to expand the networked toll system nationwide, starting with the Jingshen expressway as some kind of testing ground. For now, the change is being accepted positively. Average speed on the expressway has gone up, and a May 2004 law on traffic in general raised maximum speed limits on expressways nationwide from 110 km/h to 120 km/h. This makes traffic jams on this expressway either rare, or a thing of the past.

Detailed itinerary

The following is a list of interchanges  along the expressway from Beijing to Shenyang.

References

AH1
Expressways in Beijing
Transport in Harbin
Expressways in Tianjin
Expressways in Hebei
01
Expressways in Liaoning
Expressways in Jilin
Expressways in Heilongjiang